Daniele Riccio of the Università di Napoli Federico II, Napoli, Italy was named Fellow of the Institute of Electrical and Electronics Engineers (IEEE) in 2014 for contributions to satellite-based synthetic aperture radar imaging.

References

Fellow Members of the IEEE
Living people
Academic staff of the University of Naples Federico II
Year of birth missing (living people)
Place of birth missing (living people)